Phantom, phantoms, or the phantom may refer to:
 Spirit (animating force), the vital principle or animating force within all living things
 Ghost, the soul or spirit of a dead person or animal that can appear to the living

Aircraft
 Boeing Phantom Eye, a High Altitude, Long Endurance (HALE) unmanned aerial vehicle
 Boeing Phantom Ray, a stealthy unmanned combat air vehicle 
 McDonnell FH Phantom, a jet fighter aircraft, introduced 1947
 McDonnell Douglas F-4 Phantom II, a supersonic air-defense fighter and fighter-bomber, introduced 1960
 Phantom (UAV), a series of unmanned aerial quadcopters developed by DJI
 Phantom X1, ultralight aircraft

Boats
DC‐14 Phantom, an American catamaran design
Flying Phantom Elite, a French hydrofoil catamaran sailboat design
Flying Phantom Essentiel, a French hydrofoil catamaran sailboat design
Phantom (dinghy), a British catboat design
Phantom (pilot boat), Sandy Hook pilot boat built in 1867 from the designs by Dennison J. Lawlor
Phantom (yacht), schooner-yacht built in 1865 by Joseph D. Van Deusen
Phantom 14, an American lateen-rigged sailboat design
Phantom 14 (catamaran), an Italian sailboat design
Phantom 16 (catamaran), an Italian sailboat design

Film
 O Fantasma, a 2000 Portuguese film whose name translates to "The Phantom" or "The Ghost" in English
 Phantom (1922 film), a silent film directed by F. W. Murnau
 Phantom (2002 film), a Malayalam film
 Phantom (2013 film), a film about a submarine captain trying to prevent a war
 Phantom (2015 film), an Indian political thriller film directed by Kabir Khan
 Phantom (2023 film) film, a South Korean film set in 1993 during Japanese colonization of Korea
 Phantoms (film), a 1998 film adaptation of the Dean Koontz novel
 The Belgrade Phantom, a 2009 Serbian film
 The Phantom, the main antagonist in the animated television series Flying Rhino Junior High
 The Phantom, an adventure comic strip title created by Lee Falk
 Phantom (character), the strip's protagonist
 The Phantom (1961 film), an unaired television film pilot for a series based on the comic strip
 The Phantom (1996 film), a film directed by Simon Wincer starring Billy Zane, based on the comic strip
 The Phantom (serial), a 1943 film serial based on the comic strip
 The Phantom (1931 film), an American film directed by Alan James
 The Phantom (2021 film), a documentary film about a possible wrongful execution in Texas
 The Phantom of the Opera (disambiguation), which lists the 1925, 1943, 1962, 1983, 1987, 1989, 1998, 2004, and 2011 film productions of The Phantom of the Opera

Literature
 Phantom (Kay novel), by Susan Kay
 Phantom (MÄR), a manga character
 Phantom (Nesbø novel), a 2012 novel by Jo Nesbø
 Phantom (Sword of Truth), a 2006 novel by Terry Goodkind
 Phantoms (novel), by Dean Koontz
 Phantom Magazine, a 2005 magazine edited by Nick Mamatas
 "The Phantom", an alias of the Superman comics villain Bizarro
 The Phantom, an adventure comic strip title created by Lee Falk
 Phantom (character), the strip's protagonist
 The Phantom (play), by Dion Boucicault
 The Phantom Tollbooth, a 1961 novel by Norton Juster and illustrated by Jules Feiffer
The Phantom of the Opera, a 1910 novel by Gaston Leroux
 "The Phantom of the Opera", the titular nickname of the novel's character Erik
 The Phantom of the Opera (adaptations), a list of adaptations of the novel in various media
 The Ghost in the mill (Fantoma din moară), a novel by Doina Ruști

Gaming
 CCI Phantom, a paintball marker
 Metal Gear Solid V: The Phantom Pain, a game from the Metal Gear series
 "Phantom", a ghost type in the video game Phasmophobia 
 Phantom, a demonic spider creature that serves as a boss in the video game Devil May Cry
 Phantom Animatronics, the antagonists of Five Nights at Freddy's 3
 Phantom Thieves, the group of main characters in Persona 5
 Phantoms, a type of enemy in The Legend of Zelda video game series 
 Phantoms, a type of undead flying mob from the sandbox game Minecraft
 The Phantom, the title given to a nameless spy who is the main villain of Phoenix Wright: Ace Attorney – Dual Destinies
 The Phantom (game system), a cancelled cloud-based video game console from 2004

Medical
 Computational human phantom, a computerized model of the human body used primarily for radiation dose simulation
 Imaging phantom, an object used as a substitute for live or cadaver subjects
 Phantom limb, the sensation that a missing limb is still attached to the body
 Phantom pain, a perceived sensation

Military
 "Phantom", the name of the GHQ Liaison Regiment, a World War II special reconnaissance unit
 "Phantom Division", the name of the United States' 9th Armored Division

Music 

 "Phantom 105.2", a former name for the radio section TXFM
 Phantom Records, a record label
 Phantom Regiment Drum and Bugle Corps
 Vox Phantom, a guitar

Albums 
Phantom (Betraying the Martyrs album), 2014
Phantom (Khold album), 2002
 Phantoms, by Alan Hull
 Phantoms, by Hans Christian
 Phantoms, by Marianas Trench
 Phantoms (Acceptance album), 2005
 Phantoms (Freezepop EP), 2015
 Phantoms (Marianas Trench album), 2019
 Phantoms (The Fixx album), 1984
 The Phantom (album), a 1968 album by Duke Pearson
 The Phantom of the Opera (2004 soundtrack), the soundtrack album for the 2004 film The Phantom of the Opera

Bands 
 Phantom (band), a South Korea-based hip hop project trio
 Phantoms (duo), a Los-Angeles based EDM duo
 The Phantom Band, a Proto-Robofolk sextet based in Glasgow

Musicals and works 
 Phantom (musical), 1991
 Phantoms, a choral work by Ernst Toch
 The Phantom of the Opera (1986 musical), by Andrew Lloyd Webber

Songs 
 "Happy Phantom", by Tori Amos from Little Earthquakes, 1992
 "Phantom", by Broadcast from Work and Non Work, 1997
 "Phantom", by Capsule from More! More! More!, 2008
 "Phantom" and "Phantom Pt. II", by Justice from Cross, 2007
 "Phantom", by Rina Sawayama from Hold the Girl, 2022
 "Phantom", by Smokepurpp from Deadstar, 2017
 "Phantom", by T-Pain from Three Ringz, 2008
 "Phantom", by The Dirty Heads from Home – Phantoms of Summer, 2013
 "Phantom", by The Story So Far from The Story So Far, 2015
 "Phantom", a song about a pilot of namesake plane in the Vietnam War, unknown date
 "Phantom Lord", by Metallica from Kill em' All, 1983
 "Phantoms", by Meshuggah from Immutable, 2022
 "The Phantom", a pseudonym used by Jerry Lott for the primal rockabilly song "Love Me"
 "The Phantom of the Opera" (song), from the 1986 musical The Phantom of the Opera

Sports

Teams 
 American hockey:
 Adirondack Phantoms (2009–14)
 Lehigh Valley Phantoms (since 2014)
 Philadelphia Phantoms (1996–09)
 Pittsburgh, Pennsylvania:
 Pittsburgh Phantoms (ABA), basketball 
 Pittsburgh Phantoms (NPSL), soccer 
 Pittsburgh Phantoms (RHI), roller hockey 
 Wiesbaden Phantoms, American football, Wiesbaden, Germany

Individuals 
 "The Phantom", Chris Martin (cricketer) (born 1974), New Zealander
 Thoroughbred racehorses:
 Phantom (horse) (1808–1834), British sire
 The Phantom (horse) (born 1985), New Zealand

Television
 Danny Phantom, a Nickelodeon cartoon series
 Danny Phantom, the titular character of the series
 "Phantom" (Law & Order: Criminal Intent), an episode of Law & Order: Criminal Intent
 Phantom (Russian TV series), an eight-part crime drama series first broadcast in 2020
 Phantom (South Korean TV series), a South Korean police procedural television series
 Phantom 2040, a French-American animated series loosely based on the comic strip hero The Phantom, created by Lee Falk
 Phantom Flan Flinger, masked pie-throwing character on Tiswas
 "Phantoms" (Stargate Atlantis), an episode of Stargate Atlantis
 "Phantoms" (The Flash), an episode of The Flash
 "The Phantom" (Mad Men), a 2012 episode of the American television drama series Mad Men
 The Phantom (miniseries), a 2010 science-fiction television miniseries inspired by the comic strip The Phantom
 The Phantom of the Opera (miniseries), an American TV miniseries starring Charles Dance

Other uses
 Gillig Phantom, a transit bus
 "Phantom", a nickname of the Filipino war hero Salvador A. Rodolfo, Sr. (1919–2012)
 Phantom, a preserved British Rail Class 08 locomotive
 Phantom (high-speed camera brand)
 Phantom Galaxy, another name for the galaxy Messier 74
 Phantom Killer, American serial killer
 Phantom power, a method of sending DC electrical voltage through microphone cables
 Phantom read, a phenomenon that can occur within a database transaction at certain isolation levels
 Phantom Rock, a tourist destination in the Wayanad district of Kerala, India
 Rolls-Royce Phantom, a line of full-sized luxury cars

See also
 Apparition (disambiguation)
 Fantom (disambiguation)
 Fantome (disambiguation)
 Phantasm (disambiguation)
 Phantosmia, a form of olfactory hallucination
 The Phantom of the Opera (disambiguation)